Female Performer of the Year may refer to:

 AVN Award for Female Performer of the Year
 XBIZ Award for Female Performer of the Year